Ugrin from the kindred Csák (c. 1207 – 27 November 1248) was a Hungarian prelate in the 13th century, who served as Archbishop of Split from 1244 until his death.

Family
Ugrin was born into the Újlak branch of the powerful gens (clan) Csák, an ancient Hungarian kindred. His namesake uncle was Ugrin Csák, the influential Archbishop of Kalocsa from 1219 to 1241.

His parentage is uncertain. Late 19th-century genealogist János Karácsonyi considered Ugrin was a grandson of Bás (II) through a hypothetical unidentified son, which, however, is unlikely, since, according to the family tree thus drawn, Ugrin's assumed cousin (John) and second cousins would have survived him for more than half a century. Historian Pál Engel argued Ugrin was the son of Pós (or Pous), who served as Ban of Severin and Master of the treasury in 1235. Engel incorrectly distinguished two noblemen named Pós, assuming a father-son relationship. Péter Galambosi proved the identification between them. He considered Ugrin was perhaps the son of Bás (II), the brother of Pós and Ugrin of Kalocsa.

Early career

Ugrin (also Ugrinus or Hugrinus) was born around 1207. Under the patronage of his namesake uncle, he entered ecclesiastical service and joined the Dominican Order. He studied at the University of Paris, where he spent twelve years and his theologian studies was funded by his uncle (Croatian historiography mistakenly often attributes this data to Stephen II, Bishop of Zagreb since an error made by Nada Klaić). Ugrin bore the title of magister, reflecting his education. Ugrin was referred to as lector of the cathedral chapter of Kalocsa in December 1233.

Thereafter, Ugrin became the first known provost of the collegiate chapter of Čazma (Csázma), located in the Diocese of Zagreb. During the first Mongol invasion of Hungary (1241–1242), Ugrin joined the accompaniment of King Béla IV of Hungary, who fled to Zagreb, escaping from the advancing Mongols. According to the contemporary Thomas the Archdeacon's Historia Salonitana, Ugrin was among those barons and prelates, who escorted the monarch to Dalmatia and entered Split (Spalato) then Trogir (Trau) in early 1242.

Prelate

The presence of the royal court in Dalmatia during the Mongol invasion intensively affected the election of archbishops, and, consequently, the autonomy of Split. The citizens and the local clergy elected Bishop Stephen of Zagreb, the king's candidate as their new archbishop in the summer of 1242, but his election was never confirmed and had to relinquish his title. The cathedral chapter, excluding the burgher magistrates, elected Thomas the Archdeacon, the proponent of the local medieval commune movement, as his successor in 1243; the burghers protested against the process which was contrary to customary law in Split. Thomas withdrew from the nomination. Under the pressure of Béla IV, the chapter elected Ugrin Csák as the Archbishop of Split in 1244, when the city, under Matej Ninoslav, embroiled into conflict with Trogir. Ugrin represented the Hungarian influence over Split in the following years. Following the royal victory against Matej Ninoslav, Béla, who sought to consolidate his royal authority in Dalmatia, appointed Ugrin as comes (ispán or župan) of Split on 2 October 1244 too, thus the archbishop also became responsible for the secular affairs in the city. Beside that, Ugrin was also installed as count of Cetina and the islands Brač, Lastovo and Korčula.

Thomas the Archdeacon and his followers considered Ugrin's election as invalid, but they remained in the minority. His activity as archbishop is mostly narrated by his political opponent Thomas the Archdeacon, which is thus understandably not free from bias. Ugrin and his escort arrived to Split shortly after the Easter of 1245 (16 April). Archbishop-elect Ugrin played an important role in restoring peace between Split and Trogir in 1245; since he primarily sought to represent Hungarian royal interests in Dalmatia over those of his city and archiepiscopal see, he was willing to settle the conflict as soon as possible; the conditions of the peace was seriously disadvantaged for Split. Archdeacon Thomas blamed Ugrin that he "behaved mildly and peacefully" towards the enemies of the city, while reserved his "full harshness and severity for his fellow citizens".

Pope Innocent IV confirmed Ugrin's election on 7 July 1246. He was consecrated as archbishop by his suffragans, Treguanus of Trogir, Nicholas of Hvar, Bartholomew of Skradin and Philip of Senj in the Cathedral of Saint Domnius on 20 September 1247. After his consecration, he sent Philip of Senj to the Roman Curia of Lyon for his pallium. Returning Dalmatia, Philip handed over the pallium to Bartholomew of Skradin in accordance with the pope's instruction. Bartholomew, who had by then resigned and entered the Franciscan order, invested Ugrin to his archbishopric officially. Following that, Ugrin installed a fellow Hungarian Dominican friar John Hahót as the Bishop of Skradin in 1248.

Ugrin Csák died on 27 November 1248, after a severe illness. Archdeacon Thomas claims that Ugrin secretly confessed "his sins and certain excesses" on his deathbed. He was buried in the Church of the Friars Preachers of Split. Following his death, John Hahót, Bishop of Skradin was elected as archbishop by Ugrin's confidants, but the pope refused to confirm him and, instead, appointed Roger of Torre Maggiore in 1249. Ugrin was succeeded as comes of Split by Stephen Gutkeled, Ban of Slavonia.

References

Sources

Primary sources

Archdeacon Thomas of Split: History of the Bishops of Salona and Split (Latin text by Olga Perić, edited, translated and annotated by Damir Karbić, Mirjana Matijević Sokol and James Ross Sweeney) (2006). CEU Press. .

Secondary sources

 
 
 
 

1200s births
1248 deaths
13th-century Hungarian people
13th-century Roman Catholic archbishops in Croatia
Archbishops of Split
University of Paris alumni
Ugrin
Hungarian Dominicans